Joseph ibn Yahya ben Solomon (16th century) was a prominent Portuguese biblical commentator.

Born in Portugal, his father, Solomon ibn Yahya (1470 - 1533) was a prominent rabbi in Portugal. In his early years, he and his brother Gedaliah ibn Yaha ben Solomon left Portugal and settled in Castile. Joseph was the author of some liturgical poems, but they were destroyed in a conflagration. Joseph was a pupil of Solomon ben Adret, at whose death he wrote an elegy that was reprinted. He defrayed the cost of repairing a synagogue built in Calatayud by one of his ancestors and had three sons, the most notable of which was Gedaliah ibn Yahya ben Joseph.

References 

1494 births
1539 deaths
16th-century Italian rabbis